This was the first edition of the 2017 Copa Ciudad de Tigre tournament.

Máximo González and Andrés Molteni won the title after defeating Guido Andreozzi and Guillermo Durán 6–1, 6–7(6–8), [10–5] in the final.

Seeds

Draw

References
 Main Draw

Copa Ciudad de Tigre - Doubles